Sir Robert Hill Smith, 3rd Baronet of Crowmallie (born 15 April 1958) is a Scottish Liberal Democrat politician who was the Member of Parliament for West Aberdeenshire and Kincardine from 1997 to 2015.

Early life
Educated at the Merchant Taylors' School, London and the University of Aberdeen (MA), he was a member of the Social Democratic Party before its merger with the Liberal Party to form the Liberal Democrats.  He served as an Aberdeenshire Councillor and Convener of the Grampian Joint Police Board 1995–97.

His grandfather represented the same constituency as a Unionist from 1924 until 1945.

Parliamentary career
Smith contested Aberdeen North in 1987 and was first elected to Parliament in 1997. He was the Liberal Democrat Deputy Chief Whip in the House of Commons.

Smith's areas of political interest include energy policy, rural issues and international development. He has been a member of the Energy & Climate Change Select Committee since it was created in 2009, acting as Interim Committee Chair from June to November 2013. He sat on the International Development Select Committee from 2007 to 2009.

He serves as Honorary Vice-President of Energy Action Scotland, a fuel poverty charity, and is a Vice-Chair of the All-Party Group for the UK Offshore Oil and Gas Industry. He is Vice-Chair of the Post Offices APPG and Co-Chairs the APPG on Afghanistan. He represents a large rural constituency where the oil and gas industry, subsea engineering and marine renewables are major employers. He served on the Energy and Climate Change committee from 2009 to 2015.
 
His previous portfolios include party Energy spokesperson, Deputy Chief Whip and shadowing the Scotland Office; he has served on the Trade & Industry Select Committee, Scottish Affairs Select Committee and the Procedure Committee.

Smith stood for reelection in the 2015 general election, but was defeated by Stuart Donaldson of the Scottish National Party.

Personal life
Smith succeeded to the baronetcy of Crowmallie upon his father's death in 1983. He married Fiona Cormack in 1993; they have three daughters.

The heir presumptive to the title is his brother, Charles Smith.

In 2013, Smith was diagnosed with Parkinson's disease.

In 2020, the family seat, Crowmallie House, was put up for sale.

References

External links
 Profile at the Liberal Democrats
 Sir Robert Smith Bt MP Scottish Liberal Democrats profile

 Blood money: the MPs cashing in on Zimbabwe's misery

1958 births
Living people
Alumni of the University of Aberdeen
Anglo-Scots
Smith, Robert Hill, 3rd Baronet
People educated at Merchant Taylors' School, Northwood
Scottish Liberal Democrat councillors
Scottish Liberal Democrat MPs
Social Democratic Party (UK) politicians
UK MPs 1997–2001
UK MPs 2001–2005
UK MPs 2005–2010
UK MPs 2010–2015